Addicted is a 2014 American erotic thriller drama film directed by Bille Woodruff from a screenplay by Christina Welsh and Ernie Barbarash, based on Zane's novel of the same name. It stars Sharon Leal, Boris Kodjoe, Tasha Smith, Tyson Beckford, Emayatzy Corinealdi, and William Levy. The film was released in the United States on October 10, 2014, by Lionsgate. it received generally negative reviews from critics

Plot
Zoe Reynard (Sharon Leal) has the perfect life with her husband Jason (Boris Kodjoe) and two children, and is the CEO of her own company which signs and develops aspiring artists. One evening she attends an art show of Quinton Canosa (William Levy); the two meet and share some flirtation. Zoe later visits his apartment to discuss a contract, and the two end up having sex.

Zoe feels guilty and tries to end it with Quinton; they break up regularly but always inevitably end up getting back together. On one particular occasion, when Zoe goes to get back with Quinton, she finds him having sex with his neighbour.

Throughout the film, Zoe is telling this story as a flashback to her psychotherapist, Dr. Marcella Spencer (Tasha Smith), who after diagnosing her with sex addiction, assumes it might have been something from Zoe's past that keeps coming back to haunt her and pressures her to confess. However, each time her psychotherapist asks, Zoe avoids the question and walks out.

Zoe's addiction begins to take over her life; she soon begins sleeping with a second man, Corey (Tyson Beckford), whom she met at a club. One day, when she comes home from work, she finds Corey at her home talking to her mother. Seeing the danger she had put her family in, Zoe decides that she wants to try to fix her marriage with Jason. She invites both Corey and Quinton to meet her at Quinton's apartment and breaks up with both of them.

Corey becomes angry and lunges at her but Quinton blocks him. As Corey leaves, Quinton knocks him out with a vase. Zoe becomes afraid of Quinton and tries to calm him down; Quinton tells her that she is not going to leave him. Frightened, Zoe shoves glass artwork between them, smashing it to pieces. She then hides from Quinton who is chasing her with a knife. Suddenly Jason appears and smashes a sculpture over Quinton's head. Jason reveals he found out about Zoe cheating via her cellphone.

Zoe runs after Jason, apologizing profusely, but he rejects her. Out of desperation, Zoe walks in front of a car, injuring herself. The two split up and Jason stays in a hotel. Zoe becomes a recluse but soon goes to a sex addiction group-therapy session. It is discovered that the root of Zoe's addiction was because of a rape committed by three boys when she was 10 years old. At the session she speaks of her deep love for her husband, and Jason walks in, kisses her and accepts her back.

Cast 
 Sharon Leal as Zoe Reynard, owner of Zoe & Co., an artist-marketing agency
 Boris Kodjoe as Jason Reynard, Zoe's husband and an architect
 William Levy as Quinton Canosa, an artist who becomes Zoe's lover
 Brandon Gonzales as Tony
 Tyson Beckford as Corey, one of Zoe's lovers
 Kat Graham as Diamond, Quinton's other lover
 Tasha Smith as Dr. Marcella Spencer, a psychotherapist specializing in sexual addiction
 Maria Howell as Nina, Zoe's mother
 Garrett Hines as Benny
 Emayatzy Corinealdi as Brina, Zoe's assistant and best friend
 Hunter Burke as Shane
 Cameron Mills as 10 year old Zoe
 Daniel O'Callaghan as chubby businessman
 Landon Runion as Peter Reynard, Zoe's son
 Lauren Marquez as Kayla Reynard, Zoe's daughter
 John Newberg as Balthazar Crayne
 Paul Hall as Marley
 Omar Mughal as handsome man

Production
Principal photography began in November 2012 in Atlanta and the surrounding areas.

Reception
On Rotten Tomatoes, the film has a rating of 7%, based on 14 reviews, with an average rating of 3.05/10. On Metacritic, the film has a score of 32 out of 100, based on 9 critics, indicating "generally unfavorable reviews".

See also
 List of black films of the 2010s

References

External links
 
 
 
 
 

2014 films
2014 independent films
2014 thriller drama films
2010s erotic drama films
2010s erotic thriller films
African-American drama films
American erotic drama films
American erotic thriller films
American independent films
American thriller drama films
2010s English-language films
Films about adultery in the United States
Films about sex addiction
Films based on American novels
Films directed by Bille Woodruff
Films scored by Aaron Zigman
Films shot in Atlanta
2010s American films